Seftigen District was one of the 26 administrative districts in the Canton of Bern, Switzerland. Its capital was the municipality of Seftigen. The district had an area of 189 km² and consisted of 25 municipalities:

References

Former districts of the canton of Bern